Katya Lazova (born 17 January 1950) is a Bulgarian athlete. She competed in the women's high jump at the 1968 Summer Olympics.

References

External links
 

1950 births
Living people
Athletes (track and field) at the 1968 Summer Olympics
Bulgarian female high jumpers
Olympic athletes of Bulgaria
People from Kyustendil
Sportspeople from Kyustendil Province
20th-century Bulgarian women
21st-century Bulgarian women